Mogote is a district of the Bagaces canton, in the Guanacaste province of Costa Rica.

History 
Mogote was created on 26 November 1971 by Decreto Ejecutivo 2077-G. Segregated from Bagaces.

Geography 
Mogote has an area of  km² and an elevation of  metres.

Villages
The town of Guayabo is the administrative center of the district.

Other villages include Barro de Olla, Horcones, La Ese, Limonal, Manglar, Mochadero, Pueblo Nuevo, Rincón de La Cruz, San Isidro de Limonal, San Jorge, San Pedro and Torno.

Demographics 

For the 2011 census, Mogote had a population of  inhabitants.

Transportation

Road transportation 
The district is covered by the following road routes:
 National Route 164
 National Route 165

Economy
The economic activity of Mogote is based on agriculture (kidney beans, onions, and sugarcane), and on livestock and dairy industry.

Thanks to the energy-producing potential of the Miravalles, the Instituto Costarricense de Electricidad (ICE) started a geothermal project in the region, which brought employment opportunities. Something new in this area is the Eolic Power; more than 25 wind turbines were installed. 

Nowadays, the area's commerce and tourism industries have developed rapidly, taking advantage of the potential offered by the use of thermal waters, horseback riding, and canopy tours.

References 

Districts of Guanacaste Province
Populated places in Guanacaste Province